Chill Out is an album by reggae band Black Uhuru, released in 1982 (see 1982 in music).  The album was recorded at Channel One Studios in Jamaica and produced by Sly and Robbie.  Featuring The Revolutionaries, an influential session group, Chill Out, together with its dub companion The Dub Factor, is widely considered a classic of reggae music.

Reception
Chill Out peaked at #146 on Billboard's (North America) Pop Albums chart.

Reviewing the album for AllMusic, Jo-Ann Greene said:
Arguably the best of Black Uhuru's electrofied albums, even if its predecessor Red was the bigger sell, Chill Out is a seminal blend of styles and cultures... The sound is extremely dense, but the producers still found plenty of space for Black Uhuru's sublime vocals. Over, under, and around the band, the electronic effects whoosh, pulling the album from its island roots, and planting it firmly in an international environment. This is most notable on the title track, which blends rootsy rhythms with a dance beat, and urban stylings with a tinge of world music... On Chill Out, the vocalists, band, and producers came together as one, and created more than a masterpiece; the album remains a stunning legacy for all involved.

Track listing

Personnel

Musicians
 Wally Badarou - synthesizer, vocoder
 Barry Reynolds -	guitar on "Wicked Act"
 Ansel Collins - 	piano, keyboards
 Radcliff "Dougie" Bryan - guitar
 Mikey Chung - guitar
 Sly Dunbar - drums, syndrums, arranger, producer, mixer
 Puma Jones - harmony vocals
 Chris "Sky Juice" Burth - percussion
 Robert Lyn -	piano
 Bertram "Ranchie" McLean - rhythm guitar, organ
 Michael Rose - vocals
 Robbie Shakespeare - bass guitar, arranger, producer, mixer
 Derrick "Duckie" Simpson - harmony vocals
 Uziah "Sticky" Thompson - 	percussion

Technical
 Sly Dunbar             - arranger, producer, mixer
 Robbie Shakespeare     - arranger, producer, mixer
 Bruce Hamilton	 - engineer
 Steven Stanley	 - engineer, mixer
 Neville Garrick	 - design
 Lynn Goldsmith	 - photography

References

Black Uhuru albums
1982 albums
Mango Records albums
Albums produced by Sly and Robbie